The  is a kei truck produced by the Japanese automaker Suzuki. In Japan, the Carry and Every are kei cars but the Suzuki Every Plus, the bigger version of Every, had a longer bonnet for safety purposes and a larger 1.3-liter 86-hp (63 kW) four-cylinder engine. They have been sold under myriad different names in several countries, including those with Chevrolet and Ford badges.

Introduction 
In their home market, the Carry truck and van (and Every van) have traditionally competed with a number of similarly sized vehicles, such as the Kurogane Baby, Honda Acty, Subaru Sambar, Mitsubishi Minicab, and Daihatsu Hijet. Some of these are also competitors in export markets, mainly the Carry and the Hijet.

The first two generations of Carrys were sold with the Suzulight badge rather than the company name Suzuki, emphasizing the company's focus on "Light Cars" (also known as kei jidosha).

First generation (FB/FBD; 1961) 

The Carry series was born in October 1961 with the FB Suzulight Carry, a pickup truck with the engine underneath the front seat, but with a short bonnet. The layout has been referred to as a "semicabover". The FB Carry underwent some light modifications in October 1963, for the 1964 model year. A glassed FBD Carry Van was added in September 1964. This engine remained in use, in three-cylinder form, until late 1987 in the Suzuki Jimny (as the LJ50). FB suspension was rigid with leaf springs, front and rear. A panel van (FBC) was also available from July 1962.

Second generation (L20; 1965) 

In June 1965, the rebodied L20 Suzulight Carry replaced the FB. The ladder-frame chassis was modified, now with independently sprung front wheels (by torsion bars). While output remained 21 hp, the engine benefitted from Suzuki's patented Cylinder Crank Injection  lubrication system. The Carry Van was replaced by the new L20V in January 1966, and there was also a dropside pickup (L21). Finally, the L20H, a pickup with a canvas canopy and a rear-facing seat placed in the bed, providing seating for four, was offered. Top speed for the second generation was down to 75 km/h. The Carry Van had a horizontally divided, two-piece tailgate, and sliding rear windows.

Production of this more traditional version continued in parallel with the cabover L30 Carry, ending only with the 1969 introduction of the L40.

Third generation (L30/L31; 1966) 

The new L30 Suzuki Carry (the "Suzulight" label was being retired) is a full cabover design, with the same FB engine mounted horizontally underneath the load area. The starter and generator were combined and mounted directly on the front of the crankshaft. Introduced in February 1966, the L30 was built alongside its more traditional predecessor until they were both replaced by the L40. A canopied L30H, similar to the L20H, but with the seats in the bed facing each other, was available from the start. Also, an L31, with a drop-side bed, was available. Performance and mechanics were very similar to its bonneted sister, but the load area was considerably larger. Maximum load capacity was still .

A short-lived Carry Van version of the L30 ("L30V") was not introduced until March 1968, but offered four doors and a two-piece tailgate (top and bottom). Bodywork was the same ahead of the B-pillar.

Fourth generation (L40/L41; 1969) 

In July 1969, the Giugiaro-designed L40 Carry was introduced. In November of the same year, a van version with two opening side doors and a top-hinged rear gate was added. Giugiaro's design was more obvious in the Carry Van iteration, very symmetrical with similar looks to the front and rear. The L40's design was not overly utilitarian, limiting interior space and being a bit too modern for the usually very orthodox Japanese commercial customer base. The L40 did benefit, though,  from an updated,  reed valve version of the now venerable FB engine.

As part of a minor facelift in April 1971, the Carry received a 27 PS (still at 6,000 rpm) version of the well-known FB engine, featuring Suzuki's Cylinder Crank Injection and Selmix lubrication system. This engine also found its way into the recently introduced LJ10 Jimny. The Panel Van version has a boxy unit mounted on the rear of a Carry truck chassis. In 1971, a V40FC Camper version of the Van was also added.

While the truck versions were replaced in May 1972, the L40V continued for another three months before an L50 Van took its place.

Fifth generation (L50/L60; 1972) 

The fifth-generation L50 Carry truck debuted in May 1972, followed by a new Carry van in August. The new model echoes Giugiaro's design, but without ventilation windows in the front doors and with a more traditional appearance. Headlights are now round, while the van version receives a more square rear body and with a sliding rear side door.

In December 1972, a five-door van (L50VF, with sliding side doors) was added. Three months later, the dropside L51 went on sale. In November 1973, the Carry underwent a minor facelift, receiving a new grille and modified front bumper. The interior was also updated, with a new dashboard and finally hanging gas and clutch pedals. The fifth-generation Carry led Suzuki to great market success, with Suzuki selling more kei trucks than all others during 1973 and 1974.

In September 1975, a special export version was introduced, aimed at customers who wanted more loading ability. For 1975, the Carry received minor changes allowing for the fitment of new larger license plates. In December 1975, the domestic market L50s' engine lost two horsepower (down to 26) in the effort of fulfilling new, stricter emissions standards.

Sixth generation (ST10/ST20/ST80; 1976) 

In May 1976, responding to changed standards for the kei class, Suzuki released the Carry 55, chassis code ST10/ST10V. It had the larger, water-cooled but still two-stroke three-cylinder LJ50 engine of 539 cc but was otherwise hard to distinguish from the preceding L50 series. The only two differences in appearance were bigger (albeit slimmer) bumpers, which no longer enveloped the bottom of the front, as well as slightly altered doors with a slight bump in the swage line to accommodate the door handle. There was also an ST11 version with a drop-side bed. The ST10 (along with the LC20 Fronte) was the first Suzuki to enter CKD production in Indonesia, in 1976. In 1977 it was replaced by the larger ST20.

Soon thereafter, in September 1976, the interim ST10 (only built for four months) was gradually replaced by the widened and lengthened ST20 pickup version, which also has a longer wheelbase. Marketed as the Suzuki Carry Wide 550, it now reached the maximum dimensions set for the class. In November, the ST20 Van tcame in - this version was  shorter than the truck as it reused the shorter rear side bodypanels of the L50 and ST10 versions. Some special variants of the ST10 (such as refrigerated versions, panel vans, etcetera) remained on sale alongside the ST20 for a little while longer until new versions could be developed and old stock be sold out. There was also an ST20K model available: the "K" refers to the "trucklike" nature of the vehicle in that it had three drop-sides as opposed to the utility version which had only a tailgate and formed sides. Maximum power remained  at 4500 rpm. In October 1977, after about 187,000 had been built, the ST20 underwent a light facelift, with increased equipment and all versions (excepting the base truck) now featuring a front grille.

Equipment levels were base, Standard, and Super Deluxe. The base version has no front grille, the Standard has a black grille, while the Super Deluxe features chrome trim on the grille and chromed hubcaps. By October 1977, the Custom Van was available in the Japanese market. Well equipped, with metallic paint, reclining fabric-covered seats, and chrome bumpers, this was aimed squarely at use as a private car. This heralded the development of the future "Every" range of passenger microvans.

By 1977, the export-only ST80 appeared - this version was the first Carry to be equipped with a four-stroke engine, the inline-four 797-cc F8A as recently introduced in the LJ80 Jimny. In the Carry, however, the engine only developed  at 5500 rpm. The ST20 Carry was also produced in Indonesia from 1978 until at least 1983, where it was nicknamed "Turungtung" (or Truntung). This is an onomatopoetic word for the sound made by the Carry's two-stroke engine. The ST20 Carry was the first Suzuki product to be built in Indonesia, where it saw extensive use as an Angkot. The ST20 was only offered as a truck in Indonesia, but local body builders such as Adi Putro and Liling Putra came up with multi-seat taxi bodies and other variations.

Seventh generation (ST30/ST40/ST90/ST100; 1979) 

In March 1979, the new ST30 series arrived. The dimensions remained the same as before, as did the two-stroke engine, although it was moved forward and now resided underneath the front seat. At the time of the ST30's introduction, the Carry had been the bestselling Kei truck in the Japanese domestic market for eight straight years. For export markets, the ST90 version was equipped with the larger four-stroke F8A engine of 797 cc, entering production in August 1979. In October 1980, the domestic market Carry became available with the new 543 cc four-stroke F5A engine (ST40), although the torquey two-stroke engine remained popular. Later, export models were also fitted with the 970 cc four-cylinder engine; they received the ST100 chassis codes.

In December 1982, the Van portion of the Carry range became separated in the Japanese domestic market and was now sold as the Suzuki Every. The Every was only available with the four-stroke engine, as the two-stroke could not pass the tighter emissions standards for passenger cars. New for May 1981 was a four-wheel drive version, originally only available as a pickup. This received the ST31/41 chassis code. A four-wheel drive van version was added in November 1982.

Export models

China 
Changhe was the first manufacturer to produce minivans and pick-up trucks in China; they assembled 151,629 units of the Carry.

Pakistan 
In Pakistan, Pak Suzuki Motors, a smalltime affiliate of the Suzuki Motor Corporation, still assembles and distributes the Suzuki Bolan, based on the ST90V version of the Carry (also known as Hi-Roof) with the three-cylinder F8B 796 cc fuel injected engine with output of 39 hp (29 kW) and 62Nm (46 lbf⋅ft) of torque. As of 2021 it is available as either a plain, panelled Cargo Van with vinyl seats or as the seven-seater VX variant which features air conditioning. The Bolan is widely used as an ambulance all over Pakistan and as a taxi in parts of the country. There is also a pickup version, called Ravi.

Taiwan 
The Ford Pronto is a rebadged Carry ST, which was manufactured between 1985 and 2007 by Ford Lio Ho, a joint venture between Ford and Lio Ho in Taiwan. The Pronto was only available in the Taiwanese market, where it was introduced specifically to compete with China Motor Corporation's Mitsubishi Minicab and Sanfu's Subaru Sambar in the local minivan market. In 2007, Ford Lio Ho ceased to produce the Pronto because the engine couldn't be made to meet revised local environmental regulations.

Indonesia 

This carried the ST100 model code, and was also available as a minivan. Unlike other markets, the minivan version did not equipped with sliding doors and lift up tailgate.

In 1986, it was updated with a new half-trapezium front headlight, but only lasted for less than six months and was replaced again with square headlights by the end of 1986 (until the end of production in 2009) with new front and larger bumpers; this model was originally sold as the "Super Carry Extra". These dimensions remained true until the end of Carry 1.0 production in Indonesia. Unlike most markets, Indonesian Carry trucks could legally seat three people. In 1989 the Super Carry received a five-speed transmission, as well as a tachometer. In April 1995, Suzuki equipped the Carry Extra with power steering, as well as the redesigned steering wheel with Suzuki S logo. The Suzuki Carry Extra shares the same steering wheel as the Suzuki Katana GX and the Suzuki Futura.

Late in the model's life, the engine was updated to meet the Euro 2 emissions standards, which took effect in Indonesia in 2007. Although removed from the regular price lists in 2006, this version of the Carry was still built to special order until 2009, alongside the larger Carry Futura (based on the eighth generation Carry). Until 1987, when surpassed by the Daihatsu Zebra and Toyota Kijang, the Carry was Indonesia's best selling vehicle.

The seventh generation Carrys in Indonesia, alongside the eighth generation Carry Futura, are widely used as transportation minibuses known locally as "angkot".

India 

The Maruti Suzuki Omni is a microvan manufactured by Suzuki's Indian subsidiary Maruti Suzuki. The first version of Maruti Suzuki Omni had a  inline-three engine, same as the Maruti 800 city car. Sold simply as the Maruti Suzuki Van, this was the second vehicle to be launched by Maruti Suzuki. It arrived one year after the 800, in 1984. The name was changed to "Omni" in 1988. It received a facelift in 1998, and further minor revisions in 2005, when improvements were made to the exterior and the interior, and new colours became available. Later version of the Omni includes the:

Omni (E), released in 1996, an 8-seater microbus version of the Omni
Omni XL - 1999, as the Omni E but with a higher roof.
Omni Cargo LPG - 2004, created to answer the growing popularity of this car being used as an inter-city cargo vehicle.
Omni LPG - 2003, same 796 cc engine, added with a factory fitted LPG Kit, authorised by the Indian RTOs (Regional Transport Offices). This makes it the most economic four-wheeler in India, as far as driving costs are concerned.
Omni Ambulance - A Omni E, designed for ambulance usage. This is the most common type of ambulances found in Indian cities.

The Omni could be divided into two categories: the family version and the cargo version. The newer family version has two extra seats directly behind the front seating and facing away towards the rear of the van making it an eight seater. Older versions are modified by individual owners to add additional capacity this way. The cargo version is completely devoid of back seats. Both versions have sliding back doors and hatchbacks.

The Omni (E) has the following official specifications (2010):

The initial versions were so basic that the interior dashboard even lacked a fan blower opening as a standard.

In April 2019, Maruti Suzuki announced they would discontinue the Omni after 35 years of production. The Omni was not able to meet India's updated safety and emission standards implemented the same month, which requires new vehicles to have a driver's airbag, antilock brakes, seatbelt reminders, speed warning beeps and rear parking sensors. The flat front of the Omni also prevented the addition of crumple zones. Its replacement is the Eeco.

South Africa 
For this market, the Carry was available as truck, van and high roof van, all powered by 797cc F8A four cylinder engine. The car is popularly called "half loafs", referring to "half a loaf of bread" (still a staple of many South Africans). In Cape Town and Durban, many of these little vans are seen painted in bright yellow with green artwork and a chopped-off open rear end. These are part of large fleets of privately owned public transport vehicles which fit between normal taxis and city buses. Customers literally hop on the back, and pass the driver a rand or two, and simply jump off at their destination.

Eighth generation (DA71/DB71/DA81/DA41/DB41/DA51/DB51; 1985) 

The eighth generation Carry (and second generation Every) appeared in March 1985. It was modernized and the range again expanded, with a more powerful fuel injected engine available on top. The chassis codes became quite confusing, with DA/DB71 used for the F5A engined model (DB signifying four-wheel drive) and DA81 for the two-stroke truck which remained available until the Carry underwent a facelift in July 1986. T, B, and V suffixes were used to denote trucks, trucks with tip decks, and vans. In May 1989 the more modern multi-valve F5B engine entered the lineup; it received the DA/DB41 chassis code and replaced most of the F5A engines. This new engine also became available in the badge-engineered Autozam Scrum, sold by Mazda (DG/DH41).

Facelift
With the rules regarding the size and engines of kei-cars being altered for March 1990, Suzuki had to update the Carry/Every which now carried the DA/DB51 chassis code. This engine became standard fitment for the lower end Carrys as well in March 1991, but only six months later the DA/DB51 was replaced by the reshelled ninth generation Carry and Every.

Export models
Post-1985 European market Carrys still used the 797 cc four-cylinder F8A familiar from the ST90 Carry, while Super Carrys were equipped with the F10A 970 cc four. Chassis codes are SK408 and SK410, while power outputs are 37 and 45 PS respectively (27.5 and 33 kW), top speeds 110 and 115 km/h. Heftier bumpers meant overall length was up 10 cm, for a total of 3295 mm. Production of export models began in July 1985. The SK408 (sometimes called the DA11) was discontinued in October 1989. The SK410 Super Carrys (DA21) received the same F10a 970cc inline-four as fitted to the SJ410 Samurai. In much of Europe, this generation of the Carry was also sold as the Bedford, Vauxhall, or GME Rascal. These were built at the GM plant in Luton, to circumvent JAMA's voluntary export restrictions.

In Australia, this model was sold as both the Super Carry (in ute, van, or wagon form) and as the Holden Scurry, which was not available as a "ute". In Australia, the Scurry was designated as the NB series.

The Super Carry continues in production in Vietnam for local markets, as a truck or panel van, with a Euro 2 emissions compliant engine. The 970 cc engine has electronic fuel injection and develops  at 5500 rpm.

Bedford Rascal 

The Bedford Rascal (later Vauxhall Rascal), also built as the Suzuki Super Carry, is a kei truck and microvan that was developed as a joint venture between the American car company General Motors (GM) and the Japanese automaker Suzuki. It was sold under GM's British-based Bedford marque as well as in Suzuki form. Other names were used in a few international markets, such as GME (General Motors Europe) for those continental European markets where Suzukis were generally not marketed and where the "Bedford" and "Vauxhall" brands were largely unknown.

The van was produced at the IBC Vehicles plant in Luton, England, adjacent to the main Vauxhall factory (GM's British-based passenger car marque). Alongside the Bedford, the Suzuki-branded twin was manufactured for the European market (where Bedford is a less established brand).

Sold from 1986 to 1994, the Rascal, like the Super Carry, is a small and economical van intended for many purposes. The vehicle's strengths were its diminutive size and maximum payload weight; 550 kg for the van and 575 kg for the pickup. The principal visible difference between Bedford and Suzuki versions is the front trim: the Super Carry has two separate plastic headlamp surrounds and the Rascal has a single full width one with "Bedford" moulded in the middle.

Timeline:

 1986: launched
 1990: rebadged as the Vauxhall Rascal, as the Bedford marque was being retired
 1993: production moved to Japan, where the vehicle continued to be made until 1999.

Rascals were mainly sold as vans; pickup and camper versions were also made.

Daewoo Damas

The Daewoo Damas is a badge-engineered version of the Suzuki Carry/Every produced by the South Korean automaker Daewoo since 1991. It is currently in its second generation and is available in van and pickup body styles, the latter of which was marketed as the Daewoo Labo. Since 2011, the Damas and Labo are sold in South Korea without branding, essentially making "Damas" and "Labo" the brands.

In some export markets, the Daewoo Damas was known as the Daewoo Attivo and since General Motors' takeover of Daewoo, it has been known in some markets, such as Central America and Tunisia, as Chevrolet CMV for the passenger van (Damas) and Chevrolet CMP for the pickup truck (Labo).

The Damas and Labo both come with the three-cylinder SOHC 796-cc F8C engine rather than the smaller 660-cc units originally used in Japan, to provide more power and comfort. Both the Damas and Labos are only available with a manual transmission. Air conditioning is optional. The engine was originally made for petrol, but is recently only available in South Korea as an LPG-powered unit.

The Damas microvan is available as a seven-seat coach, five-seat coach, or two-seat cargo van styles and comes with various options based on DLX (deluxe) and SUPER models. The Labo is also available in STD (standard), DLX (deluxe), and SUPER models. Two main choices of the Labo body type are the cube van and the drop-side pickup truck. The pickup has an optional electric tailgate lift.

This was marketed as the Daewoo Damas II in South Korea. Over the years, the Labo has been equipped with a number of the various grille and headlight combinations originating with the Japanese Carry and Every variations. In January 2007, Labo and Damas production was halted as they could not be made to meet emissions regulations. Production resumed (as the New Damas) in April 2008, although now only with LPG engines for the home market. In March 2011, the "Daewoo" badging was dropped, leaving the cars without a "family name" in the South Korean market.

In December 2013, production was again halted, as the Damas and Labo would not meet requirements for all motor vehicles produced after 2014 to have oxygen sensors installed. The Damas and Labo also do not fulfill South Korean requirements for on-board diagnostics to be installed, although they have been exempted from such regulations. A campaign by small business owners, stoking fear of a flood of Chinese imports replacing the domestic-made trucklets, pushed the government to create an exemption for the Damas and Labo, and production recommenced in August 2014. South Korean production was extended to 2020, when the government's moratorium on meeting the emissions requirement was to run out. In 2019, however, the Korean government further extended this exemption, allowing the little trucks to remain in production for another year at least.

VIDAMCO of Vietnam produced the Damas in complete knock-down kit until 2018.

Uzbekistan
The Damas is the predominant form of public transport in Uzbekistan. In Damas marshrutkas, generally far more than seven passengers are crammed. Local production at the newly established UzDaewoo Auto began in 1996. The Damas and the Labo, alongside the Tico, were the company's first products. Local parts content has gradually increased over the years. In 2004, the Daewoo Labo truck was discontinued, but it was returned to production as the "Chevrolet Labo" in 2015. The Labo is only built in UzAuto's Khorezm Plant, in the town of Pitnak. The longer-nosed Daewoo Damas II replaced the original design in 2006. Subsequent to General Motors' takeover of the UzDaewoo plant in 2008, the name of the Damas II was changed to "Chevrolet Damas." Since about that time, the Chevrolet Damas has been offered in a basic Van trim or as the 7-seater Deluxe, with a colorful graphic along the flank.

Ninth generation (DC51T/DD51T/DE51V/DF51V; 1991) 

The ninth generation Carry (and third generation Every) appeared in September 1991. The 657 cc F6A engine remained from the previous generation, but an all-new bodywork was much smoother, originally with slim, small rectangular headlights. The chassis was largely unchanged for the truck (albeit with a somewhat longer wheelbase), but the vans had a considerably longer wheelbase and an engine mounted midships, just ahead of the rear axle. Chassis codes changed accordingly, and were now different for the Carry and the Every. The trucks are DC/DD51T and the vans are DE/DF51V ("DD" and "DF" for four-wheel drive versions). Two different front treatments were available, one with small rectangular aerodynamic headlights and one with large, round units (used on lower-spec models).

The ninth-generation Carry received a very gentle facelift in September 1993, including a switch from front drum brakes to discs on all models. Two months later, the Carry Van line switched to the Every nameplate and the division between trucks and vans was made clearer. Another light change occurred in July 1995, when the front turn signals were changed from clear to amber and the wheel bolt pattern was changed from 4x114.3mm to 4x100mm. The ninth generation continued to be built until 1999. Most export markets continued to receive the previous generation Carry with bigger engines and most commonly with van bodywork. The older Super Carry is generally more rugged than the DE/DF51, which was fitted with a coil sprung De Dion rear axle not as suitable for carrying heavy loads. In those rather few foreign markets where the ninth generation Carry was available, it was sold as the SK306 and with a version of the 657 cc engine used in the Japanese domestic market. In late 1997, the retro-styled Suzuki Every C arrived.

Tenth generation (1999)

Tenth generation Carry and fourth generation Every (DA52/DB52/DA62/DA63; 1999) 

The tenth generation Carry was introduced in January 1999, with its van version dropped the Carry name in favour of Every in Japan. It retained the F6A engine (albeit modernized) and was sold as the DA/DB52 T and V (Carry truck or Every van, "DB" signifying four-wheel drive). This marked the end of using "Carry" badging on vans in the Japanese domestic market. In June 1999 the DA52W (Every Wagon, only with two-wheel drive) appeared, along with the bigger Every Plus. In 2001 a version with the more powerful timing chain equipped K6A (still of 660 cc displacement) appeared, as the DA62T/V/W. This model has also been built by Chang'an (Chana) in China, as the "Star" (Zhixing) bus and truck (originally SC6350, SC1015). in which they have gone through many revisions since 2009.

The Carry truck was completely rebodied in May 2002 and received door redesign in April 2009, but the existing Every Van and Wagon continued to be produced until replaced in August 2005, as the two lines continued a process of divergence begun with the introduction of the Every in 1982.

Fifth generation Every (DA64; 2005)

The fifth generation Every was introduced in Japan in August 2005. The Every Wagon received a facelift in May 2010.

From 2013 until 2015, the fifth generation Every was rebadged and sold by Mitsubishi Motors as the Minicab and Town Box, and by Nissan as the NV100 Clipper.

Eleventh generation (2013) 

The eleventh generation Carry was introduced in Japan in August 2013, followed with the sixth generation Every in February 2015.

Separate models  
Suzuki also developed several non-kei car version of Carrys for different markets around the world.

Suzuki Carry Futura/Suzuki Futura/Super Carry  

In April 1989, Suzuki reaches an agreement with Mitsubishi for joint development of light commercial vehicle in Indonesia. Those light commercial vehicles were later introduced as Suzuki Carry Futura (later just Suzuki Futura when the 'Carry' nameplate was dropped in 1994 to distinguish with the ST100 Suzuki Carry 1.0) and Mitsubishi Colt T120SS, the former debuted first in mid-February 1991. Instead of positioned as the successor of the older Carry ST100, the Futura was sold together as the bigger alternative of Carry in Indonesia and also available as 4-door van, wide deck truck with three-way opening and bare chassis. The bare chassis version is usually converted into a microbus by local bodybuilders, for use as an angkot, or share taxi like the older Carry ST100.
Initially it has a 1,360 cc G13C engine with ST130/SL413 internal model codename. The engine was based on G13A engine but with bigger bore and developed exclusively for Futura. The truck was also sold in Malaysia as Suzuki Futura, dropped the Carry nameplate. 

A minor facelift occurred in August 1997 with the introduction of  1,590 cc G16A engine option (ST160/SL416) and puts out . Later in early 2000s, the 1,493 cc G15A engine (ST150/SL415) was introduced, replacing both 1.3 and 1.6 engines, as the Indonesian government imposed higher tax for engine above 1500 cc in 2000 and also as an efficiency strategy after the 1997 Asian financial crisis. The original, carburetted engine produces  at 6000 rpm. In March 2005, the 1.5 engine was upgraded to fuel injection rather than the earlier carburettor due the implementation of the Euro 2 emission standard, the cylinder head was also updated from 8 to 16-valve. Two more facelifts occurred in April 2009, and again in January 2017. The Futura (and the bigger APV-based Mega Carry truck) was discontinued in February 2019 due the implementation of Euro 4 emission standard and replaced by newer Carry (DC/DN61T) few months later.

Mitsubishi Colt T120SS
The name of Colt T120SS is a continuation of the first generation Mitsubishi Delica, which was marketed as the "Colt T120" in many countries including Indonesia. When production began in 1991, it replaced the Minicab-based "Jetstar" mini truck. The T120SS is based on the locally developed Futura, with which it shares everything aside from the engines, grille, taillights and slightly bigger bed. Overall length is 3,720 mm (3,940 mm for the "3-way wide deck" version).

Just like the Futura, the Colt T120SS is available as either a bare chassis, a regular pickup truck, or three-way wide deck, with the exception of 4-door van. Initially the truck was powered by Mitsubishi's carburetted 1343 cc 4G17 engine and puts out  at 6000 rpm. This engine had the same specs from its time of introduction in 1991 until in 1996 when it was redesigned and no longer an interference engine. In March 2005, the engine was replaced by a bigger and fuel injected 1468 cc 4G15 engine, The larger unit, which meets Euro 2 emission standards, produces  at 5750 rpm. Both engines feature three valves per cylinder or 12-valve in total. The truck was lightly facelifted, with a new grille featuring a triangular central portion. From 1991 to 2019, Mitsubishi Motors built 324,960 units of the T120SS. The last T120SS rolled off the production line at PT Krama Yudha Ratu Motor plant in Pulo Gadung, East Jakarta on 22 January 2019 without replacement like the Futura.

Maruti Suzuki Super Carry 

Starting in 2016, Maruti Suzuki has launched a small commercial truck called Super Carry in India, based on the Futura. This model receives 140 mm longer wheelbase and different interior than the original model. In India, the truck is powered by either 1196 cc G12B four-cylinder CNG or 793 cc two-cylinder turbodiesel engines and both mated to a 5-speed manual transmission. The latter was first diesel engine developed by Suzuki and also the first for Carry's family. The minuscule engine is not able to power an air-conditioning system. The diesel engine was discontinued in India in March 2020 as the engine is not compliant with the Bharat Stage 6 emissions standard.

The Super Carry was also exported to Africa from April 2016 which powered by 1.2 petrol engine. In the Philippines, the truck was introduced in October 2016 and only powered with the same 793 cc diesel engine as the Indian version. It is available with more variety of bodywork such as flat-bed truck, utility van, cargo van or prepared to be fitted with Jeepney bodywork. After the all-new model Carry arrived in the Philippines in 2019, the Super Carry continued to be sold alongside it until it was discontinued few months later.

Suzuki Every Plus/Carry 1.3 

The Every Plus, was an enlarged seven-seat MPV version of the Every (passenger version of the Carry). With chassis code DA32W It was fitted with the considerably larger 1.3 litre G13 engine. The image to the right is of the Every Plus, introduced in June 1999. The name was changed in May 2001 to Every Landy, accompanied by a facelift introducing a large chromed grille.

With Carry 1.3 badging (chassis DA32) Truck and Van versions of the Every Plus were sold in various right hand drive export markets, including the United Kingdom and Australia. The truck version was available with constant four-wheel drive. The Wagon model was also sold as the Suzuki E-RV in Malaysia. It was also sold in certain other markets, such as Chile, as the Carry SK413 (truck) or as the Mastervan (van).

Weight:
2WD: 
4WD: 
Maximum power:  at 5,700 to 6,000 rpm
Maximum torque:  at 3,000 rpm

Maruti Suzuki Versa/Eeco

The Maruti Suzuki Versa is a licensed variation of the Every Plus for the Indian market and was built by Maruti Suzuki from October 2001. It is the second van released by Maruti Suzuki since the Maruti Suzuki Omni was released in 1984. About seventy percent of the vehicle components are made within India. The Versa was discontinued in late 2009, after only having been built to order in small numbers for some time.

There were two basic versions of this car produced; the two 8-seater DX/DX2 versions and the 5-seater STD version. The DX2 version of the Versa was equipped with twin air conditioners for front and rear. The Versa was fitted with the same 16-valve, 1.3-liter four-cylinder engine generating  at 6000 rpm as the Every Plus. It is controlled by a 16-bit engine management system.

The initial target audience for this vehicle were customers who planned to buy a sedan like the Maruti Esteem or a utility vehicle like Tata Sumo. The  engine is located under the front seat. The Versa can reach from 0–60 mph in 13.5 seconds.

Maruti Suzuki Eeco was introduced in India by Maruti Suzuki in January 2010. This car is a refresh of the Versa, but equipped with a new 1196 cc four-cylinder in-line engine. The Eeco makes 55 kW (73 bhp) at 6000 rpm, 101 Nm (74 ft lb) at 3000 rpm. It is delivered in either 5-seater or 7-seater versions.

Chinese derivatives
Chang'an/Chana Star (SC6320G) is a licensed variation of the Suzuki Every Plus for the Chinese market. Changan has the license due to the Changan Suzuki joint venture. The front DRG of the Star was completely redesigned, but from the rest of the body panels, the relationship with the Suzuki Every Plus was still clearly visible. Newer models of the Chana Star are still available for production as of 2020. Examples include the Chana Star 5 truck and Chana Star 3 minivan.

The Changhe Suzuki Landy was a passenger minivan based on the fifth-generation Every, sold in China between 2007 and 2012.

Further re-badged versions were sold under the Tiger Truck brand in North America.

Suzuki Carry (2019) 

Newer version of international Carry has been produced in Indonesia by Suzuki Indomobil Motor since 2019. Replacing the Carry Futura series as well as the Mega Carry, it uses the 1.5 L (1,462 cc) K15B-C engine, producing . It was launched at the 27th Indonesia International Motor Show on 25 April 2019 and is exported to nearly 100 countries. It was also launched in Thailand on 16 August 2019 and in the Philippines on 26 September 2019.

The Carry received a facelift on 21 January 2021 and currently only available for Indonesian market.

Nameplate use with other vehicles

Suzuki Mega Carry

The pickup truck version of the Suzuki APV was sold as the Suzuki Carry in export markets, Suzuki Mega Carry in Indonesia, and Super Carry Pro in Vietnam. It was sold in export markets from 2005, in Indonesia from 2011, and was discontinued in February 2019.

References

External links
  (Japan)
  (Indonesia)

Carry
Kei trucks
Cab over vehicles
Microvans
Pickup trucks
Vehicles introduced in 1961